The Artivist Film Festival & Awards is an international film festival and awards ceremony dedicated to recognizing activist efforts of filmmakers, specifically in the areas of human rights, child advocacy, environmental preservation, and animal rights.

Background
The Festival is held annually and tours internationally. Its mission is to strengthen the voice of activist/artists ("artivists"), while raising awareness for global causes. The festival is produced by Artivist Collective, a nonprofit organization founded in August 2003 by Diaky Diaz, Bettina Wolff, and Christopher Riedesel.

The first Artivist Film & Awards Festival was held April 27, 2007 at Hollywood's Egyptian Theater. Honorees were Ed Begley, Jr., Tippi Hedren, Mike Farrell and France Nuyen.

Set to coincide with Earth Day, when the 2nd Annual Artivist Film Festival began on April 20, 2005, Los Angeles Mayor James Hahn  declared the day "Artivist Day", and among the festival's 2005 honorees were James Cromwell and Mira Sorvino.

The third annual festival was held in Los Angeles on November 9, 2006, and premiered the film Fast Food Nation. Festival honorees included Joaquin Phoenix, Daryl Hannah, and Matthew McConaughey.

Board and honorees
Artivist's advisory board includes Congressman Dennis Kucinich, actor James Cromwell, actor/director James Haven, and Senator Barbara Boxer.  Past honorees include Ted Danson, Alyssa Milano, Claes Nobel, James Cromwell, Mira Sorvino, Ed Begley, Jr., Tippi Hedren, Mike Farrell, France Nuyen, Joaquin Phoenix, Daryl Hannah, and Matthew McConaughey, among others.

Award winners

2011
Best Feature - Artivist Spirit: "Love Hate Love" directed by Dana Nachman and Don Hardy
Best Short - Artivist Spirit: "Crooked Beauty" directed by Ken Paul Rosenthal
Best Feature - Children's Advocacy: "Surfing Soweto" directed by Sara Blecher
Best Short - Children's Advocacy: "Grace" directed by Meagan Kelly
Best Feature - Animal Advocacy: "Green" directed by Patrick Rouxel
Best Short - Animal Advocacy: "Saving Pelican 895" directed by Irene Taylor Brodsky
Best Feature - Environmental Preservation: "Spoil" directed by Trip Jennings
Best Short - Environmental Preservation: "The Leaves Keep Falling" directed by Julie Winokur
Best Feature - International Human Rights: "Because We Were Beautiful" directed by Frank van Osch
Best Short - International Human Rights: "Umoja" directed by Elizabeth Tadic

2010
Best Feature - Artivist Spirit: "ReGeneration" directed by Philip Montgomery
Best Short - Artivist Spirit: "Arena" directed by Jota Aronack
Best Feature - Children's Advocacy: "Kids of the Majestic" directed by Dylan Verrechia
Best Short - Children's Advocacy: "Sarah" directed by Brandon Hess
Best Feature - Animal Advocacy: "Africa's Lost Eden" directed by James Byrne
Best Short - Animal Advocacy: "Albatrocity" directed by J. Ollie Lucks, Iain Frengley, Edward Saltau
Best Feature - Environmental Preservation: "Deep Green" directed by Matt Briggs
Best Short - Environmental Preservation: "The Krill is Gone" directed by Jeffrey Bost
Best Feature - International Human Rights: "Complexo - Universo Paralelo" directed by Mário Patrocinio
Best Short - International Human Rights: "Mine: Story of a Sacred Mountain" directed by Toby Marsden

2009
Best Feature - Artivist Spirit: "Intelligent Life" directed by Brian Malone
Best Short - Artivist Spirit: "Rough Cut" directed by Taghreed Saadeh
Best Feature - Children's Advocacy: "Children of War" directed by Bryan Single
Best Short - Children's Advocacy: "The One Wayz" directed by Linda Chavez
Best Feature - Animal Advocacy: "Ice Bears of the Beaufort" directed by Arthur C. Smith III
Best Short - Animal Advocacy: "Abe" directed by Khen Shalem
Best Feature - Environmental Preservation: "Belonging" directed by Gerard Ungerman
Best Short - Environmental Preservation: "Urubus têm Asas (Vultures Have Wings)" directed by Marcos Negrão and Andre Rangel
Best Feature - International Human Rights: "La Mission" directed by Peter Bratt
Best Short - International Human Rights: "Intersection" directed by Jae Woe Kim

2008
Best Feature - Artivist Spirit: "Zeitgeist: Addendum" directed by Peter Joseph (This was the festival opening movie)
Best Short - Artivist Spirit: "Sovereignty" directed by Jonathan Sale
Best Feature - International Human Rights: "They Turned Our Desert Into Fire" directed by Marck Brecke
Best Short - International Human Rights: "Tibet: Beyond Fear" directed by Michael Perlman
Best Feature - Children's Advocacy: "Bomb Harvest" directed by Kim Mordaunt
Best Short - Children's Advocacy: "Returned: Child Soldiers of Nepal's Maoist Army" directed by Robert Koenig
Best Feature - Animal Advocacy: "Companions to None" directed by Bill Buchanan
Best Short - Animal Advocacy: "Blinders" directed by Donald Moss
Best Feature - Environmental Preservation: "One Water" directed by Sanjeev Chatterjee
Best Short - Environmental Preservation: "Eudaimonia" directed by Jude Shingle

2007
Best Feature - Artivist Spirit: "Zeitgeist" directed by Peter Joseph
Best Short - Artivist Spirit: "The Rich Have Their Own Photographers" directed by Ezra Bookstein 
Best Feature - International Human Rights: "American Drug War" directed by Kevin Booth
Best Short - International Human Rights: "The Worst Job in the World" directed by Jens Pedersen
Best Feature - Children's Advocacy: "Glue Boys" directed by Phil Hamer
Best Short - Children's Advocacy: "Girl Stars: Anita the Beekeeper" directed by Vikash Nowlakh
Best Feature - Animal Advocacy: "Beyond Closed Doors" directed by Hugh Dorigo
Best Short - Animal Advocacy: "Sharks - Stewards of the Reef" directed by Holiday Johnson
Best Feature - Environmental Preservation: "Out of Balance" directed by Tom Jackson
Best Short - Environmental Preservation: "Anthropology 101" directed by Wayne Brittendon

2006
Best Short - Human Rights: "A QUESTION OF LOYALTY" directed by Randall Wilkins 
Best Feature - Human Rights: "Occupation 101" directed by Sufyan Omeish and Abdallah Omeish
Best Short - Children's Advocacy: "DAUGHTERS AND SONS: PREVENTING CHILD TRAFFICKING IN THE GOLDEN TRIANGLE" directed by Sarah Feinbloom 
Best Feature - Children's Advocacy: "SITA: A GIRL OF JAMBU" directed by Kathleen Man
Best Short - International Environmental Preservation: "FREEDOM FUELS" directed by Martin O'Brien 
Best Feature - International Environmental Preservation: "Crude Impact" directed by James Jandak Wood
Best Short - Animal Advocacy: "THE MEATRIX II" directed by Louis Fox 
Best Feature - Animal Advocacy: "MAD COWBOY" directed by Dr. Michael Tobias
Best Short - Artivist Spirit: "BELIEVE" directed by Synthian Sharp 
Best Feature - Artivist Spirit: "CLASS ACT" directed by Sara Sackner

2005
Best Short – Environmental Preservation: "OIL AND WATER" directed by Corwin Fergus
Best Feature– Environmental Preservation: "OIL ON ICE" directed by Dale Djerassi
Best Short – Animal Advocacy: "WITNESS" directed by Jennifer Stein
Best Feature – Animal Advocacy: "Earthlings" directed by Shaun Monson
Best Short – International Human Rights: "Seoul Train" directed by Jim Butterworth, Lisa Sleeth & Aaron Lubarsky
Best Feature – International Human Rights: "TRUDELL" directed by Heather Rae
Best Short – Children's Advocacy: "HUMMINGBIRD" directed by Holly Mosher
Best Feature – Children's Advocacy: "STOLEN CHILDHOODS" directed by Len Morris 
Best Short – Artivist Spirit: "EMMANUEL'S GIFT" directed by Lisa Lax and Nancy Lax
Best Feature – Artivist Spirit: "HOPE" directed by Catherine Margerin

2004
Best Feature – Environmental Preservation: "BLUE VINYL" directed by Judith Helfland
Best Short– Environmental Preservation: "GOOD RIDDANCE" directed by Nick Hilligoss
Best Feature – Animal Rights: "CHATTEL" directed by Rebecca Harrell
Best Short– Animal Rights: "4 DAYS" directed by Richard Hauck
Best Feature – Children's Advocacy: "BORN INTO BROTHELS" directed by Ross Kauffman and Zana Briski
Best Short – Children's Advocacy: "OLD ENOUGH TO KNOW BETTER" directed by Joel Venet
Best Feature – Human Rights: "WE INTERRUPT THIS EMPIRE" directed by Rana Freedman
Best Short – Human Rights: "BID 'EM IN" directed by Neal Sopata
Best Feature – Artivist Spirit: "A LIFE OF DEATH" directed by Dawn Westlake 
Best Short – Artivist Spirit: "OUTSIDE THE LINES", Directed by Markus Stilman 
Audience Award: "NOTHING WITHOUT YOU" directed by Ted Mattison and Paul Kelleher

References

External links
Official website

Contemporary art awards
Political art
Film festivals held in multiple countries
Cultural festivals in the United States
Human rights film festivals
Environmental film festivals in the United States
International art awards